Ayeneh taudani, or mirror-throwing, is one of the Nowruz traditions in northern regions of Iran. In the last days of Esfand, the last month in the Jalali calendar, a host of the youth gather together and contribute in making a double-face square mirror decorated and framed by primroses, violets, and green sticks of Shamshad. The party waits for the night to come and after dinner time they the mirror to a long piece of rope. Then all of the party goes to the neighborhood and throws the mirror, which is very well-cushioned by flowers and plants, through the intendedly left-ajar door into the middle of the house with a bunch of flowers. A member of the house brings back the mirror to the party and gifts them with comfits, halva and other food stuff especially prepared for Nowruz.

References

Society of Iran